Omar LinX is a Mexican Canadian rapper, songwriter, musician and singer. He is known for writing and performing in a variety of genres, often through collaborations with electronic dance music (EDM) and hip-hop producers.

History 

LinX co-wrote songs for Wake Up, which was released by Zeds Dead in February 2010. LinX has since collaborated on a number of songs with the group,  including their first official single re-release, "Rudeboy", and "Out for Blood",<ref name=herzog>"Live Review: Omar Linx with J. Dohe, Tyler Skyy, Minty Burns.". HipHop Vancouver' 'by: Noah Herzog</ref> which has been viewed more than five million times on YouTube. The group has released several other projects which include his contributions, including the Living Dead EP on Ultra Records and music video"Zeds (Not Quite) Dead- Music Video & Interview w/ Director Andrew Renzi". Huffington Post]. August 2, 2012 and the Victor EP on electronic music label Mad Decent.

In July 2011, LinX released his debut album City of Ommz.Fefer, Leandro, "Debut Omar LinX record a refreshing take on hip hop", Whittier College Quaker Campus, 22 March 2012

In February 2012 Zeds Dead and Omar LinX launched the Living Dead Tour, with opening acts AraabMUZIK, XI, Memorecks, Mat the Alein, and Knight Riderz.

In December 2014 LinX released his highly anticipated sophomore album M.O.R.

In November 2015 he released Back To You with Hunter Siegel and Pro Logic on Buygore Records, with a remix pack with Kname, Axel Boy, Da bow, Lumberjvck, and Algo.

In 2015 LinX continued to tour and perform his own songs.

In 2016, LinX featured in "Keep It Mello" by future bass DJ and producer, Marshmello, and released the music video for the single "Black Rose" from his M.O.R'' album.

In 2017, LinX released "621" on his Soundcloud account. The song featured Hunter Siegel, a fellow Canadian and DJ.
https://genius.com/Omar-linx-621-lyrics

References 

Year of birth missing (living people)
Living people
Canadian electronic musicians
21st-century Canadian rappers
Canadian people of Mexican descent